Gothra Bhukaran is a village in Sikar district in Rajasthan. The village has a total population of about 700 families out of which 500 families belong to Bhukar gotra Jats. The other Jat gotras in the village are Bijayrania, Kajala, Koka etc and Bharaman 

Villages in Sikar district